Virsikirja ("hymn book") is the official hymnal of the Evangelical Lutheran Church of Finland consisting of 632 hymns.

History 
The first hymnal in Finnish was compiled and edited in 1583 by Jacobus Finno. Hemminki of Masku expanded the hymnal of Jacobus Finno to publish Yxi Wähä Suomenkielinen Wirsikirja originally printed in Stockholm c. 1605. The earliest surviving imprint of this work was produced by Simon Johannis Carelius in 1607 in Rostock.

In 1701 bishop Johannes Gezelius the younger published a hymnal that had been edited by Erik Cajanus. It was later commonly called the Old Hymnal (Vanha virsikirja) and was based on a Swedish hymnal from 1695. The Old Hymnal was used for a long time in Finland, until a new one was approved by the synod in 1886. This time a hymnal was published in both Finnish and Swedish language for use in the church of Finland.

A modernized and enlarged hymnal was then approved by the synod of the Evangelical Lutheran Church of Finland in 1938, with a Swedish-language version coming thereafter in 1943. To the original 633 hymns some 40 new ones were added in the supplement published in 1963. This increased the total number of hymns to 679.

The current hymnals 
The hymnal currently in use was approved in the synod in both Finnish and Swedish version in 1986 and taken into use on Advent 1987. After 2000, a liturgical supplement was added. In 1993 a version of the hymnal in Sami language (Suoma samii salbmakirji) was also published.

The most important Finnish authors of hymn texts are Hemminki of Masku, Jaakko Haavio, Julius Krohn, Elias Lönnrot, Wilhelmi Malmivaara, J. L. Runeberg, Anna-Maija Raittila and Niilo Rauhala. Raittila and Rauhala also participated in the reform of the hymnal in the 1980s and rewrote many texts of earlier authors.

Addendum to hymnal 

An addendum to Finnish hymnal was approved by the synod of the church in November and introduced for use on the first day of Advent in 2016. The addendum consists of hymns with new text and tunes, popular spiritual songs to be added to the hymnal and introduction of hymns and spiritual songs of international origin for the first time in different languages.

See also 
 Siionin virret

Literature 
 Lempiäinen, Pentti: Virsikirja sanasta sanaan: Virsikirjan raamattuviitteet, virsikirjan sanahakemisto 2. edition. Kirjapaja, Helsinki 2007. .
 Väinölä, Tauno: Virsikirjamme virret Kirjapaja, Helsinki 2008. .

References

External links 
 Virsikirja.
 Yxi vähä suomenkielinen wirsikiria, 1607

Lutheran hymnals
Evangelical Lutheran Church of Finland